William Green T'Vault (1806–1869) was a pioneer of the Oregon Country and the first editor of the first newspaper published west of the Missouri River. T'Vault led a wagon train of 300 that arrived in Oregon in 1845, after traveling on the Meek Cutoff, a branch of the Oregon Trail. He settled in Oregon City, and was appointed Postmaster General by the Provisional Government of Oregon.

T'Vault became president of the Oregon Printing Association, which was an outgrowth of the Oregon Lyceum, and published the first issue of the Oregon Spectator on February 5, 1846. He was fired from the Spectator after 13 issues. T'Vault claimed it was because of differences with other association members, especially George Abernethy, though the association claimed it because of T'Vault's poor spelling.

T'Vault was a pro-slavery Democrat who became a member of the Provisional Legislature of Oregon in 1846. The same year he was part of a group that urged the United States Congress to disallow the land claims of earlier White residents of the region, including that of John McLoughlin at Willamette Falls. The petition was partially successful and McLoughlin's claim was not recognized.

In 1851, T'Vault led an exploring party of ten people from Port Orford in order to seek an overland route to the interior of the region. The party was ambushed by Native Americans and five members were killed, but T'Vault survived. He moved to southern Oregon and established the Table Rock Sentinel newspaper in 1855, and later the Oregon Sentinel in 1858. T'Vault represented Jackson County in the Oregon Territorial Legislature in 1858, its final year, and served as speaker of the Oregon House of Representatives during its first session, in 1858–59. He advocated for the formation of an independent Pacific Republic and also practiced law in Jacksonville.

References

Links
http://gesswhoto.com/ohs-blue-bucket.html
http://www.all-oregon.com/king/part%203.htm

Members of the Provisional Government of Oregon
Members of the Oregon Territorial Legislature
Speakers of the Oregon House of Representatives
1806 births
1869 deaths
Oregon pioneers
Oregon postmasters
People from Jacksonville, Oregon
Place of birth missing
19th-century American politicians